Tuguegarao Airport  is an airport serving the general area of Tuguegarao, the capital city of the province of Cagayan in the Philippines. Located along Maharlika Highway, the airport is accessible from adjacent municipalities in Cagayan and northern Isabela. It is classified as a major commercial domestic airport by the Air Transportation Office.

The airport is currently served by Cebu Pacific, Sky Pasada and charter airline Royal Air Charter Service. In 2018, Tuguegarao Airport recorded an annual passenger traffic of 384,819, a drastic increase of 83.81% from the previous year.

Statistics

Volume of passengers
Data of passenger movements is from the Civil Aviation Authority of the Philippines (CAAP).

Airlines and destinations

Terminal and apron
The airport consist of a 1,100 square meter terminal with its second floor to be developed during its second phase of rehabilitation— and a 150-meter by 115-meter apron. In 2015, the Department of Transportation and Communications allotted ₱45.99 million for terminal upgrades and another ₱10.67 million for runway and taxiway widening.

On March 14, 2018, the rehabilitated and expanded Passenger Terminal Building was inaugurated by Transportation Secretary Arthur Tugade.
When all the expansions and upgrades were completed, the airport is expected to cater more passenger and aircraft movement as well as safe nighttime operations.

Expansion and development
In 2015, the Department of Transportation and Communications launches the expansion and modernization program of the Tuguegarao Airport, alongside several key secondary airports in the country. Named as the Tuguegarao Airport Development Project, which consist of ₱10.67 million for taxiway and runway widening and another ₱45.99 million for the terminal upgrades.

As of 2018, the Phase 1 was completed which includes the expansion of the passenger terminal building, widening of runway and taxiway and the upgrading of the Airfield Lighting System, necessary for longer night time operations. Phase 2 of the Tuguegarao Airport Development Project, which starts in 2018, covers the expansion of the existing pre-departure and check-in areas of the passenger terminal building and additional check-in counters at the second floor.

See also
List of airports in the Philippines
Cagayan North International Airport

Notes

References

External links

Airports in the Philippines
Buildings and structures in Tuguegarao